An Hui-Suk is a former international table tennis player from North Korea.

Table tennis career
She won a silver medal for North Korea at the 1993 World Table Tennis Championships in the Corbillon Cup (women's team event) with Li Bun-Hui, Wi Bok-Sun and Yu Sun-bok.

She also reached the women's doubles quarter finals during the 1993 World Championships.

See also
 List of World Table Tennis Championships medalists

References

North Korean female table tennis players
World Table Tennis Championships medalists
Possibly living people
Year of birth missing